John William "Jack" Slater (3 September 1927 – 23 February 1997) was an Australian politician who represented the South Australian House of Assembly seat of Gilles for the Labor Party from 1970 to 1993. He was Minister of Recreation and Sport and Minister of Water Resources in the first term of the Bannon government from 1982 to 1985.

References

Members of the South Australian House of Assembly
1927 births
1997 deaths
Australian Labor Party members of the Parliament of South Australia
20th-century Australian politicians